The 4th Arizona State Legislature, consisting of the Arizona State Senate and the Arizona House of Representatives, was constituted from January 1, 1919, to December 31, 1920, during the second term of Thomas Edward Campbell, as Governor of Arizona, in Phoenix. The Democrats maintained their 14-5 majority in the Senate, but the Republicans made gains in the house, reducing the Democrat lead to 26–9.

Sessions
The Legislature met for the regular session at the State Capitol in Phoenix on January 13, 1919; and adjourned on March 13.

A one-day special session was convened on February 12, 1920.

State Senate

Members
The asterisk (*) denotes members of the previous Legislature who continued in office as members of this Legislature.

House of Representatives

Members
The asterisk (*) denotes members of the previous Legislature who continued in office as members of this Legislature.

References

Arizona legislative sessions
1919 in Arizona
1920 in Arizona
1919 U.S. legislative sessions
1920 U.S. legislative sessions